Dream Station Productions is Pakistan's first 7:1 audio recording and visual production company. Owned by Kashan Admani, the frontman of the rock band Mizmaar, Dream Station Productions was launched in 2008.

About 
Dream Station Productions is an international standard surround audio recording and post production facility. The renowned studio designer John H Brandt and foreign engineers revamped the space. Recently, Kashan Admani has produced a movie 'Carma' under the label of Dream Station Productions.

Facility 
Dream Station Productions offers two fully equipped non-linear suites that are capable of talking to one another. With a fully equipped Non Linear video editing suite, in house camera and lighting equipment, Dream Station Productions provides professional video production services too. The studio has produced and mastered a number of mainstream projects including TVCs, OSTs, and film scores.

Productions 
Dream Station Productions launched a music web series, Acoustic Station where budding and established musicians perform songs recorded live in a studio with jazz influences. The show has been produced by the front man of rock band Mizmaar, Kashan Admani. There are 14 episodes in the show that will be aired weekly. Kashmir, Maha Ali Kazmi, Latif Ali Khan, Nida Hussain, and Hamza Akram Qawwal have featured in the show so far. The production facility has recently produced a feature film Carma - The Movie that will be released in 2022.

We Are One (Global Collaboration Song) 
Dream Station Productions produced a global collaboration song featuring 40 musicians from all over the world including Grammy winning violinist Charlie Bisharat, Grammy Nominee Simon Phillips (drummer), bassist Stuart Hamm, percussionist Gumbi Ortiz, and drummer Taylor Simpson feature in the song from the United States. Other artists include guitarist, composer, and record producer Roman Miroshnichenko from Russia, singer-songwriter Dr. Palash Sen of Euphoria (Indian band) from India, actress and dancer Luiza Prochet from Brazil, Matt Laurent from Canada, and singer-songwriter Lili Caseley from the United Kingdom.

Artists from Pakistan include Faakhir Mehmood, Omran Shafique, Najam Sheraz, Bilal Ali (Kashmir), Amir Azhar, Natasha Baig, Natasha Khan (Pakistani singer), Ahsan Bari (Sounds of Kolachi), Farhad Humayun (Overload (Pakistani band)), Asad Rasheed (Mizmaar), Maha Ali Kazmi, Raafay Israr, Farooq Ahmed (Aaroh, Ali Khan (singer), Dino Ali, Salwa Najam, Babar Sheikh, Imran Akhoond, Khaled Anam, Nida Hussain, Faisal Malik, Nazia Zuberi (Rushk), Meraal Hassan, Alex Shahbaz, Ashir Wajahat, Fahad Ahmed, Ammar Khaled, Eahab Akhtar, and Sabir Zafar.

Carma - The Movie 
Dream Station Productions produced Pakistan's first new-age revenge crime thriller, Carma - The Movie. The movie features Adnan Siddiqui, Zhalay Sarhadi, Naveen Waqar, Osama Tahir, Paras Masroor, Umer Aalam, Lili Caseley, Khaled Anam and Vajdaan Shah.

References

External links 

 

Pakistani companies established in 2008
Mass media companies established in 2008
Film production companies of Pakistan